In the 1972–73 NBA season, their tenth and final season in Baltimore, Maryland, the Bullets were led by seventh-year head coach Gene Shue and won a third consecutive Central Division title. 

Prior to the season in June, forward Elvin Hayes was acquired in a trade from the Houston Rockets, for forward Jack Marin and draft picks. In the 1972 draft in April, Baltimore selected point guard Kevin Porter in the third round. After a slow start, the Bullets had a strong 10–4 record in December.  In the playoffs, they faced their playoff rivals the New York Knicks, and fell in five games in the conference semi-finals; the Knicks went on to win the NBA title.

Following the season, the Bullets made a short move to the new Capital Centre in Landover, a suburb east of Washington, D.C., and became the  The Bullets would later play 35 regular season games in Baltimore from the 1988–89 through 1996–97 seasons.

Draft picks

Roster

Regular season

Season standings

Record vs. opponents

Game log

Playoffs

|- align="center" bgcolor="#ffcccc"
| 1
| March 30
| @ New York
| L 83–95
| Archie Clark (22)
| Wes Unseld (16)
| Archie Clark (6)
| Madison Square Garden19,694
| 0–1
|- align="center" bgcolor="#ffcccc"
| 2
| April 1
| @ New York
| L 103–123
| Phil Chenier (27)
| Wes Unseld (14)
| Kevin Porter (7)
| Madison Square Garden19,694
| 0–2
|- align="center" bgcolor="#ffcccc"
| 3
| April 4
| New York
| L 96–103
| Elvin Hayes (36)
| Elvin Hayes (14)
| Riordan, Clark (4)
| Baltimore Civic Center12,289
| 0–3
|- align="center" bgcolor="#ccffcc"
| 4
| April 6
| New York
| W 97–89
| Elvin Hayes (34)
| Hayes, Unseld (13)
| Archie Clark (10)
| Baltimore Civic Center12,289
| 1–3
|- align="center" bgcolor="#ffcccc"
| 5
| April 8
| @ New York
| L 99–109
| Archie Clark (30)
| Wes Unseld (21)
| Chenier, Unseld (4)
| Madison Square Garden19,694
| 1–4
|-

Awards and honors
Elvin Hayes, All-NBA Second Team
Mike Riordan, NBA All-Defensive Second Team

References

Bullets on Basketball Reference

Baltimore
Washington Wizards seasons
Baltimore Bullets
Baltimore Bullets